Leopold Hojtasch (13 October 1887 – 1914) was an Austrian footballer. He played in one match for the Austria national football team in 1907.

References

External links
 

1887 births
1914 deaths
Austrian footballers
Austria international footballers
Place of birth missing
Association footballers not categorized by position